A crowned republic, also known as a monarchial republic, is an informal term that has been used to refer to a system of monarchy where the monarch's role may be seen as almost entirely ceremonial and where nearly all of the royal prerogatives are exercised in such a way that the monarch personally has little power over executive and constitutional issues. The term has been used by a small number of authors (below) to informally describe governments such as Australia and the United Kingdom, although these countries are classified as constitutional monarchies. A crowned republic may refer also for the historical republic with a doge as the head of the state, esp. Venice and Genoa or even the Republic of San Marino.

History
As an informal term, "crowned republic" lacks any set definition as to its meaning, and the precise difference between a constitutional monarchy and a "crowned republic" remains vague. Different individuals have described various states as crowned republics for varied reasons. For example,  James Bryce wrote in 1921:  "By Monarchy I understand the thing not the Name i.e. not any State the head of which is called King or Emperor, but one in which the personal will of the monarch is constantly effective, and in the last resort predominant, factor of government. Thus, while such a monarchy as that of Norway is really a Crowned Republic, and indeed a democratic republic, monarchy was in Russia before 1917, and in Turkey before 1905, and to a less degree in Germany and the Austro-Hungarian Monarchy until 1918, an appreciable force in the conduct of affairs".

In 1763, John Adams argued that the British Empire was a form of republic:"[T]he British constitution is much more like a republic than an empire. They define a republic to be a government of laws, and not of men. If this definition be just, the British constitution is nothing more nor less than a republic, in which the king is first magistrate. This office being hereditary, and being possessed of such ample and splendid prerogatives, is no objection to the government’s being a republic, as long as it is bound by fixed laws, which the people have a voice in making, and a right to defend. An empire is a despotism, and an emperor a despot, bound by no law or limitation but his own will; it is a stretch of tyranny beyond absolute monarchy."

The Australian Republic Advisory Committee described the country as a "crowned republic" and stated it was "a state in which sovereignty resides in its people, and in which all public offices, except that at the very apex of the system, are filled by persons deriving their authority directly or indirectly from the people" so "it may be appropriate to regard Australia as a crowned republic". Australian founding father Richard Chaffey Baker did not use the term "crowned republic" but has been identified as one of the first to articulate this view. He "proudly proclaimed his loyalty to the Queen in the same breath as he declared himself a republican", holding that republicanism did not solely revolve around absence of monarchy.

H. G. Wells (1866–1946) used the term in his book A Short History of the World to describe the United Kingdom, as did Alfred, Lord Tennyson in 1873 in an epilogue to Idylls of the King. In referring to the UK as a crowned republic, the Australian Republic Advisory Committee stated "Britain has not been a constitutional monarchy since probably the late 18th century."

In the Kingdom of Greece, the term Βασιλευομένη Δημοκρατία (Vasilevoméni Dimokratía, literally crowned democracy or crowned republic) became popular after the 23 October 1862 Revolution, which resulted in the introduction of the  1864 constitution. The Constitution of 1952 enshrined the concept into law by declaring the form of government that of a Crowned Republic. This is sometimes translated as "Crowned Democracy".

The Monarchical Republic of Queen Elizabeth I
In 1987, Patrick Collinson argued that the government of Elizabethan England (1558–1603) can be described as a "monarchical republic", because there were serious limits on the queen's independent authority, and some privy councillors sponsored a scheme to allow a brief interregnum if the queen should be killed by her Catholic enemies. Many historians have accepted and expanded upon this theory. However, in 2019, Jonathan McGovern suggested that this formulation is an exaggeration, and has been treated too seriously by subsequent historians.

See also 
Popular monarchy

Notes

References
 

Monarchy